The Europe/Africa Zone was one of three zones of regional competition in the 2008 Fed Cup.

Group I
Venue: SYMA Sportközpont, Budapest, Hungary (indoor carpet) 
Date: 30 January – 2 February

The fifteen teams were divided into three pools of four teams and one pool of three. The four pool winners took part in play-offs to determine the two nations advancing to the World Group II play-offs. The nations finishing last in their pools took part in play-offs, with the two losing nations relegated to Group II in 2009.

Pools

Play-offs

  and  advanced to the 2008 World Group II play-offs.

Group II
Venue: Coral Tennis Club, Tallinn, Estonia (indoor hard) 
Date: 30 January – 2 February

The seven teams were divided into one pool of three teams and one of four teams. The winner of each pool played the runner-up of the other pool to determine which two nations would be promoted to Group I in 2009. The nations finishing third in their pools took part in play-offs with the losing nation relegated to Group II in 2009, along with the nation finishing fourth in the pool of four teams.

Pools

Play-offs 

  and  advanced to Group I for 2009.

Group III
Venue: Master Class Tennis and Fitness Club, Yerevan, Armenia (outdoor clay) 
Date: 22–26 April

The eleven teams were divided into one pool of five teams and one pool of six. The top team of each pool progressed to Group II for 2009.

Pools

  and  advanced to Group II for 2009.

See also
Fed Cup structure

References

 Fed Cup Profile, Slovenia
 Fed Cup Profile, Switzerland
 Fed Cup Profile, Netherlands
 Fed Cup Profile, Denmark
 Fed Cup Profile, Romania
 Fed Cup Profile, Lithuania
 Fed Cup Profile, Morocco
 Fed Cup Profile, Serbia
 Fed Cup Profile, Sweden
 Fed Cup Profile, Estonia
 Fed Cup Profile, Luxembourg
 Fed Cup Profile, Great Britain
 Fed Cup Profile, Bulgaria
 Fed Cup Profile, Finland
 Fed Cup Profile, Iceland
 Fed Cup Profile, Greece
 Fed Cup Profile, Georgia
 Fed Cup Profile, Bosnia and Herzegovina
 Fed Cup Profile, Norway
 Fed Cup Profile, Turkey
 Fed Cup Profile, Zimbabwe
 Fed Cup Profile, Ireland
 Fed Cup Profile, Montenegro
 Fed Cup Profile, Latvia
 Fed Cup Profile, Moldova
 Fed Cup Profile, Armenia

External links
 Fed Cup website

 
Europe Africa
International sports competitions in Budapest
Tennis tournaments in Hungary
Sports competitions in Tallinn
Tennis tournaments in Estonia
Sports competitions in Yerevan
Tennis tournaments in Armenia
2008 Fed Cup Europe Africa Zone
2008 Fed Cup Europe Africa Zone
January 2008 sports events in Europe
February 2008 sports events in Europe
April 2008 sports events in Europe